Virginia Living is a glossy bimonthly regional lifestyle magazine with a focus on all things Virginia. Founded in 2002, it is the only statewide lifestyle magazine in Virginia.

The magazine features articles on topics such as food and drink, home and garden, arts and culture, travel, weddings, events, and Virginia-related history. The results of its annual readers' survey are published in "Best of Virginia," which appears alongside the May/June issue and includes first, second and third-place winners in 100 distinct categories covering all five regions of the state: Central Virginia, Eastern Virginia, Northern Virginia, Southwest Virginia, and Shenandoah Valley.

The magazine is headquartered in Richmond, Virginia.

References

External links
Virginia Living official site

2002 establishments in Virginia
Bimonthly magazines published in the United States
Lifestyle magazines published in the United States
Magazines established in 2002
Magazines published in Virginia
Mass media in Richmond, Virginia